The Eastern Kentucky Colonels men's basketball team is a college basketball team at Eastern Kentucky University (EKU), located in Richmond, Kentucky, United States. The Colonels are members of the ASUN Conference, which they joined in 2021 after having been members of the Ohio Valley Conference since that league's founding in 1948. Home games are played at Alumni Coliseum, located on EKU's campus. The team last played in the NCAA Division I men's basketball tournament in 2014. The Colonels are coached by A.W. Hamilton, who came to EKU in 2018 after previous head coach Dan McHale was fired after 3 seasons.

Season by season records

NOTE: Eastern Kentucky did not field a team 1917–1919 or 1943–44.

Postseason

NCAA tournament results
The Colonels have appeared in eight NCAA Tournaments. Their combined record is 0–8, with them and Boise State sharing the current record of most losses without a victory in the NCAA tournament (Iona had a win in the NCAA Tournament in 1980 before the NCAA stripped it away due to violation, which means they are "0-15").

NAIA tournament results
The Colonels have appeared in two NAIA Tournaments. Their combined record is 2–3.

CBI results
The Colonels have appeared in one College Basketball Invitational (CBI). Their record is 0–1.

CIT results
The Colonels have appeared in two CollegeInsider.com Postseason Tournament (CIT). Their combined record is 3–2.

Conference championships
The Colonels have won six conference regular season championships.

Notable players
Corey Walden, professional basketball player, 2019 Israeli Basketball Premier League MVP

References

External links

 

es:Eastern Kentucky Colonels#Baloncesto